A planetary civilization or global civilization is a civilization of Type I on the Kardashev scale. This type of civilization is likely to be reliant on renewable energy sources such as stellar power, as well as powerful non-renewable sources such as nuclear fusion. A Type I civilization's energy consumption level is roughly equivalent to the solar insolation on Earth (between 1016 and 1017 watts) ─ around 3 orders of magnitude higher than that of contemporary humanity (around 2×1013 as of 2020).

Planetary civilization – Type I civilization on Kardashev scale

Soviet astronomer Nikolai Kardashev, in his 1964 paper titled "Transmission of Information by Extraterrestrial Civilizations", proposed a scale intended to measure the level of technological development of civilizations based on the amount of energy that they are able to utilize, eponymously named the Kardashev scale.

A Type I civilization is planetary, consuming all energy that reaches its home planet from its parent star, equivalent to about 1017 watts in the case of Earth.

Carl Sagan suggested defining intermediate values (not considered in Kardashev's original scale) by interpolating and extrapolating the commonly used values for the energy consumption levels of types I (1016 W), II (1026 W) and III (1036 W). According to Sagan's extended model, modern-day humanity is describable as a Type 0.73 civilization as of 2020.

Transition to a planetary civilization

Theoretical physicist Michio Kaku, in his book Physics of the Future, published in 2011, stated that, assuming sustained economic growth, humanity may attain planetary civilization status in 100 years.

Danger

Michio Kaku, in his interview "Will Mankind Destroy Itself?" for "Big Think", discussed one possible danger of the transition to a planetary civilization:

In science fiction

Many futuristic civilizations seen in science fiction are planetary civilizations. According to Michio Kaku, a typical
Type I civilization would be that of Buck Rogers or Flash Gordon, where an entire planet's energy resources have been developed. They can control all the planetary sources of energy, so they might be able to control or modify weather at will, harness the power of a hurricane, and build cities on oceans. Nonetheless, their energy output is still largely confined to their home planet.

Next status – stellar civilization

On the Kardashev scale, the next status (Type II) is a stellar civilization, a civilization that consumes all the energy that its parent star emits, or about 1027 watts. Michio Kaku suggests in the book "Physics of the Future" that humanity may attain stellar civilization status in a few thousand years.

See also
 Nikolai Kardashev
 Noogenesis

References

Further reading

External links

 Description of civilization types from Dr. Michio Kaku

Energy development
Space colonization
Global citizenship
Global civilization